Miss Cayman Islands is a national beauty pageant in Cayman Islands.  It selects the territory's entrants in the Miss Universe and Miss World pageants.

History
The Miss Cayman started in 1932, and Gleeda Coe won the first competition in the territory. The Cayman Islands rerun the traditional pageant in 1977. In that year the Cayman Islands committed to compete internationally as a territorial at Miss World. More that that the committee successfully took a right the license of Miss Universe in 1980 when Dealia Walter achieved a major award Miss Congeniality in South Korea. In 2019 the brand of Miss Cayman Islands added Universe on Miss Cayman Islands titleholder. Since then the winner is officially a representation of the country at Miss Universe pageant. Meanwhile the Miss World license handed to Miss Cayman Islands World team when the winner goes to Miss World annually.

Titleholders

Titleholders under Miss Cayman Islands org.

Miss Cayman Islands Universe

The winner of Miss Cayman Islands represents her country at the Miss Universe. On occasion, when the winner does not qualify (due to age) for either contest, a runner-up is sent.

Miss Cayman Islands World

The winner or 1st Runner-up of Miss Cayman Islands went to Miss World. Began in 2018 the new foundation of Miss Cayman Islands World selects the winner to Miss World.

References

External links

Cayman Islands
Cayman Islands
Recurring events established in 1932
Caymanian awards